Parulia refers to a village in East Singhbum district in Jharkhand, India

Parulia may also refer to:
 Parulia, Bardhaman, a village in Purba Badhaman district, West Bengal, India
 Parulia, Diamond Harbour, a village in South 24 Parganas district, West Bengal, India